Richmond C. Beatty (January 6, 1905 – October 9, 1961) was an American academic, biographer and critic. He was the author of several books.

Early life
Richmond C. Beatty was born on January 6, 1905, in Shawnee, Oklahoma. He grew up in Birmingham, Alabama, where his father, William Henry Beatty, was a "cotton buyer." His mother was Caroline Barbour. He had a brother and two sisters.

Beatty graduated from Birmingham-Southern College, where he earned a bachelor's degree in 1926. He subsequently attended Vanderbilt University, where he earned a master's degree in 1928 and a PhD in 1930.

Career
Beatty began his career as an English professor at Tennessee State Teachers College (later known as the University of Memphis) from 1930 to 1935. He was an assistant professor of English at the University of Alabama from 1935 to 1937. He was an associate professor of English and American Literature at Vanderbilt University from 1937 to 1946, when he became a full professor. He retired from academia in 1956, and he joined the staff of The Tennessean as the literary editor.

Beatty was the author of several books, including biographies. He was awarded a Guggenheim Fellowship in 1940. He was a member of the Modern Language Association.

Personal life and death
Beatty married Floy Ward in 1927. They resided at 3627 Hoods Hill Road in the Green Hills neighborhood of Nashville. He survived throat cancer in 1956.

Beatty died on October 9, 1961, at his Nashville residence, and he was buried in the Calvary Cemetery in Nashville.

Selected works

Further reading

References

1905 births
1961 deaths
People from Shawnee, Oklahoma
Writers from Birmingham, Alabama
People from Nashville, Tennessee
Vanderbilt University alumni
University of Memphis faculty
University of Alabama faculty
Vanderbilt University faculty
20th-century American biographers
People from Green Hills, Tennessee